"Set You Free" is a song written and recorded by English rave band N-Trance, featuring vocals from English singer Kelly Llorenna. It was first released as a white label record in 1992, then officially released as a single in April 1994, just making the UK top 40 at No. 39. A re-release in January 1995 was much more successful, peaking at No. 2 in the UK. Same year, it was included on the band's debut album, Electronic Pleasure (1995). Later, it was remixed and re-released in 2001, this time reaching No. 4.

Background
The song was inspired by a night out in the Haçienda in Manchester that N-Trance's Kevin O'Toole had in 1989. "They used to pass round pints of water, and a woman came up to me and I felt her heartbeat through her top," he said. "The songs created a diary of what was happening at the time."

Llorenna was only 16 when she recorded the vocals in 1992. She told Vice: "Kevin [O'Toole] and Dale [Longworth, the other member of N-Trance] came into my college and asked if anyone sung, and everyone replied 'Kelly sings!'" They later headed to O'Toole's bedroom studio to do a vocal demo. For Llorenna, her vocals "captured that childhood moment in time. It was just me and five lads in a transit van going up to Belfast or Glasgow every week, playing the song for petrol money." She claims that when people hear the opening of the song, which features thunder, lightning and rain, "their faces light up, and they're transported back to where they were."

Critical reception
Larry Flick from Billboard described the song as a "lively Euro-NRG romp". In December 1994, Music Week wrote, "This record is now on its third release simply because retail and club reaction has demanded it. With 50,000 copies already sold, this very Euro dance-style tune could finally make the big time thanks to a strong chorus and less of the normal quota of Euro cheese." In his UK chart commentary, James Masterton said, "I would personally argue that this is a terrible record. It starts promisingly, with a strong melody powerfully sung. Thirty seconds in though this is all but swamped by a frantic rave beat, [...] N-Trance have been making inroads on the chart for over a year now but this is the first major hit for them. It is, as I said, a terrible record, but it has made No.6 first week out so what do I know?"

Chart performance
The 1995 version of "Set You Free" was successful on the charts in Europe, peaking at number two on the UK Singles Chart. It peaked at that position during its fifth week on the chart. It was held off the top spot by Celine Dion's "Think Twice". The single made it into the top 10 also in Ireland and the Netherlands, as well as on the Eurochart Hot 100, where it peaked at number nine. Additionally, "Set You Free" was a top 20 hit in Sweden and Switzerland, and went to number 44 in Germany. Outside Europe, it was a hit in Australia, where it reached number 11. It earned a gold record there, with a sale of 35,000 singles and a platinum record in the UK, after 600,000 singles were sold.

Music video
The accompanying music video for "Set You Free" was directed by prolific music video director Steve Price and shot in various locations in County Durham and North Yorkshire. The video comprises scenes of fireworks, the band dancing and singing in a nightclub, in front of Cliffords Tower in York, England and travelling in a stretched limousine. The scene at Cliffords Tower was fortuitously or coincidentally shot on 3 November 1994, which coincided with an annual Guy Fawkes Night Fireworks display organised by York City Council. The nightclub scenes were shot at Bianco's, Stockton-on-Tees. It is claimed that the video cost around £5,000 to make. 

"Set You Free" was later published on YouTube in June 2008. The video had generated more than 9.4 million views as of January 2023. In 2001, the video was reedited for the Rob Searle Radio Edit.

Track listings

 12-inch single, UK (1994)
 "Set You Free" (Original Mix)	
 "Set You Free" (Liberation Mix)
 "Set You Free" (Lost Soul Version)

 CD single, UK (1994)
 "Set You Free" (Lost Soul Version) — 4:13
 "Set You Free" (Pop Mix) — 4:05
 "Set You Free" (Original Edit) — 4:15
 "Set You Free" (Original Version) — 7:01
 "Set You Free" (TTF Remix) — 4:53
 "Set You Free" (Liberation Mix) — 6:39
 "Set You Free" (Kleptomania Mix) — 5:52

 CD single, Australia & New Zealand (1995)
 "Set You Free" (Original Radio Edit) — 4:22
 "Set You Free" (Original Mix) — 7:16
 "Set You Free" (Amsterdam Mix) — 5:28
 "Set You Free" (Lost Soul Mix) — 4:12
 "Set You Free" (Shades Of Rhythm Remix) — 6:10
 "Set You Free" (Liberation Remix) — 6:39
 "Set You Free" (Acapella (N-Trance Unplugged)) — 1:54

 CD maxi, UK (1995)
 "Set You Free" (Original Radio Edit) — 4:22
 "Set You Free" (Original Mix) — 7:16
 "Set You Free" (Amsterdam Mix) — 5:28
 "Set You Free" (Lost Soul Mix) — 4:12
 "Set You Free" (Shades Of Rhythm Remix) — 6:10
 "Set You Free" (Liberation Remix) — 6:39
 "Set You Free" (N-Trance Unplugged) — 1:54

Personnel
 N-Trance: production, writing
 Kelly Llorenna: vocals
 T-1K: raps (Lost Soul and Pop Mix)
 Tim Russell: engineering

Charts

Weekly charts
Original version

Remix

Year-end charts

Certifications

Release history

Cover versions
The Scottish band Frightened Rabbit included a cover of the song in its 2008 single Head Rolls Off.

In September 2021, English singer Kyla La Grange covered the song, saying "I wanted to re-work it in a way that brought out the sadness".

References

1992 songs
1994 debut singles
1995 singles
2001 singles
All Around the World Productions singles
Breakbeat hardcore songs
N-Trance songs